Albert "Dingy" Weiss (December 24, 1900 - September 1981) was an American bridge player from Miami Beach, Florida.

Bridge accomplishments

Wins

 North American Bridge Championships (8)
 Senior Masters Individual (1) 1947 
 Open Pairs (1928-1962) (2) 1939, 1951 
 Vanderbilt (3) 1948, 1963, 1965 
 Mitchell Board-a-Match Teams (1) 1946 
 Spingold (1) 1953

Runners-up

 North American Bridge Championships
 Masters Individual (1) 1945 
 von Zedtwitz Life Master Pairs (3) 1949, 1952, 1962 
 Vanderbilt (1) 1960 
 Mitchell Board-a-Match Teams (1) 1952 
 Reisinger (1) 1936 
 Spingold (1) 1972

Notes

External links
 

American contract bridge players
1900 births
1981 deaths
Place of birth missing
Place of death missing
People from Miami Beach, Florida